Paul Samson (4 June 1953 – 9 August 2002) was an English guitarist, closely associated with the new wave of British heavy metal.

Born Paul Sanson, his first band in 1968 was a local Kent based group called 'The Innocence' which consisted of him, Stewart Cochrane, Phil Stranders and the late Martin Kirrage. After a period in several obscure bands, Samson formed his own eponymous outfit, Samson, in 1977, consisting of Chris Aylmer on bass guitar, and Clive Burr on drums. Burr left, and eventually joined Iron Maiden, and was replaced by Thunderstick, who wore a gimp mask on stage. In 1979, the line-up was expanded to a four-piece, with the addition of Bruce Dickinson on vocals (under the stage name "Bruce Bruce".)

The band enjoyed a cult following in the new wave of British heavy metal, releasing the albums, Survivors, Head On and Shock Tactics, until 1981 when both Thunderstick and Dickinson left, the latter to join Iron Maiden.

Nicky Moore was recruited as a replacement, and Mel Gaynor then Pete Jupp took over drums, and this line-up released Before the Storm and Don't Get Mad - Get Even. These two albums sold in higher quantities than the first three, and the band toured more countries and played to bigger audiences than the Bruce/Thunderstick line-up, although the New Wave of British Heavy Metal was by now said to be a spent force. The band formally split up in 1984.

Samson spent the subsequent years in a variety of solo and group projects, including various temporary reformations of Samson, and had success as a record producer, and also as a blues player, spending a year in Chicago, Illinois, United States.
 
Despite some listings crediting Samson for playing on the Ram Jam 1977 hit single, "Black Betty", he did not play on the record. Although, Stewart Cochrane (musician and close friend to Samson since their early band days of the late 1960s, their first band at 15 years old "The Innocence" and short time member of the band "Samson") was told by Samson in 1978 that he played on the demo of the hit record "Black Betty", and was paid a paltry £20 for the session. Samson was very peeved about the payment, as he insisted to Cochrane that it was his guitar playing from the demo recording used in the final "Black Betty" pressing, and that he was missing out on a large amount of royalty payments. Cochrane can only confirm what Samson informed him of the alleged switch.

Samson died of cancer on 9 August 2002 in Norwich, whilst recording a new Samson album with Nicky Moore.

Discography

Studio albums
Joint forces (1986) (Samson album originally issued as Paul Samson solo record)
P.S.... (2006) (Samson album posthumously issued as Paul Samson solo record)

Live albums
 Paul Samson's Empire – Live at the Marquee (Original Concert Recorded in 1986 later Remastered in 1994)
 Live - The Blues Nights (2003)

References

External links
Official Paul Samson website

1953 births
2002 deaths
English heavy metal guitarists
Deaths from cancer in England
Samson (band) members
20th-century British guitarists